Thaprek may refer to:

Thaprek, Bagmati
Thaprek, Gandaki